Washington Township is a township in Page County, Iowa, USA and has a population of 195.

History
Washington Township was established in 1858.

References

Townships in Page County, Iowa
Townships in Iowa